Donal Brendan Murray (born 29 May 1940) was the Roman Catholic Bishop of Limerick from 1996 to 2009. He had previously served as an Auxiliary Bishop of the Dublin diocese

Biography

Early life and ordination
He was born in Dublin in 1940, was educated at Blackrock College, studied for a BA and master's degrees in Philosophy at University College Dublin, obtained a B.Div at St Patrick's College, Maynooth and his Licence and Doctorate in theology in Pontifical University of St. Thomas Aquinas (Angelicum). He was ordained on 22 May 1966.

Priest and bishop
He lectured in the Mater Dei Institute of Education from 1969, becoming professor of moral theology at Clonliffe College. He also lectured at UCD – from 1973 to 1982 in Catechetics and from 1978 to 1982 in Medical Ethics.

In 1981 he was appointed Titular Bishop of Glenndálocha and Auxiliary Bishop of Dublin, making him the youngest bishop at the time, aged only 41. He was appointed as bishop of Limerick on 10 February 1996 by Pope John Paul II. He was installed as Bishop of Limerick on 24 March 1996.

Abuse scandal

In November 2009, he was pressured to resign from his post after the Murphy Report found that he had mishandled child sexual abuse allegations within his diocese.

He announced his resignation to a congregation, including priests of the Diocese, people working in the Diocesan Office and the Diocesan Pastoral Centre, at 11 am (noon in Rome, the hour of the publication of the decision) in St. John's Cathedral, Limerick.

See also

Murphy Report
Catholic Church sexual abuse cases in Ireland
Catholic Church sexual abuse cases by country
Catholic Church in Ireland
Ivan Payne – subject of chapter 24 of the Murphy Report
Thomas Naughton – named in chapter 29 of the Murphy Report
Archbishop Diarmuid Martin, Primate of Ireland and Archbishop of Dublin
Eamonn Oliver Walsh, Auxiliary Bishop of Dublin – named in report
Martin Drennan, Bishop of Galway, and former Auxiliary Bishop of Dublin

References 

Roman Catholic bishops of Limerick
Alumni of University College Dublin
Alumni of St Patrick's College, Maynooth
Living people
1940 births
Catholic Church sexual abuse scandals in Ireland
Auxiliary bishops of the Roman Catholic Archdiocese of Dublin
People educated at Blackrock College
21st-century Roman Catholic bishops in Ireland
Titular bishops of Glendalough
Ecclesiastical passivity to Catholic sexual abuse cases